Lauren Holly Creamer (born 20 January 1992) is a British-born Irish racing cyclist, who previously rode for three professional teams. She also rode at the 2015 UCI Track Cycling World Championships.

References

External links
 

1992 births
Living people
Irish female cyclists
Sportspeople from Birmingham, West Midlands